The term Pygmy race can refer to a  number of things:
Congo Pygmies- a group or race of short-statured people living in the Congo rain forests
Pygmy peoples- various short-statured peoples from around the world who have been termed "pygmy"
dwarfism- a condition, usually genetic, that causes short stature in populations
Mythological figures
Dwarf (Germanic mythology)- a race of short-statured people described in Germanic mythology
Leprechauns- a race of short-statured people described in Irish mythology
Little people (mythology)- various mythologies pertaining to smaller-than-average groups of people